Pertti Johannes Alaja (18 February 1952 – 18 August 2017) was a Finnish footballer who played as a goalkeeper.

Alaja was elected as the 15th president of the Football Association of Finland on 14 October 2012, replacing Sauli Niinistö.

References

 

1952 births
2017 deaths
Association football goalkeepers
Finnish footballers
Finnish expatriate footballers
Finland international footballers
Expatriate men's footballers in Denmark
Expatriate soccer players in Canada
Expatriate footballers in Sweden
Finnish expatriate sportspeople in Canada
FC Haka players
Helsingin Jalkapalloklubi players
Ikast FS players
Allsvenskan players
Malmö FF players
Deaths from cancer in Finland
Footballers from Helsinki
Edmonton Drillers (1979–1982) players
North American Soccer League (1968–1984) players
Football Federation of Finland executives
Oulun Työväen Palloilijat players